Susanne Grainger (born 30 December 1990) is a Canadian rower. She was part of the team that won the silver medal in the Women's eight competition at the 2014 World Rowing Championships.

In June 2016, she was officially named to Canada's 2016 Olympic team.

She represented Canada at the 2020 Summer Olympics. At the Olympics, Grainger won the gold medal in the women's eights boat, Canada's first in the event since 1992.

References

External links

Susanne Grainger at RowingCanada

1990 births
Living people
Canadian female rowers
Rowers from London, Ontario
Rowers at the 2016 Summer Olympics
Olympic rowers of Canada
World Rowing Championships medalists for Canada
Rowers at the 2020 Summer Olympics
Medalists at the 2020 Summer Olympics
Olympic medalists in rowing
Olympic gold medalists for Canada

Virginia Cavaliers women's rowers
21st-century Canadian women